Holy Mess is a Swedish comedy film which premiered on 13 November 2015. The film is directed by Helena Bergström who also wrote the script along with Edward af Sillén and Daniel Réhn. The film shows how relations become strained at Christmas Eve celebrations in a modern Swedish family.

Plot
The film is centering around Simon (Anastasios Soulis) and Oscar (Anton Lundqvist), a gay couple that is expecting a child along with their close friend Cissi (Rakel Wärmländer). The problem is that their respective families don't know about this pregnancy yet, and what better time to tell their families than Christmas Eve.

Roles 
 Maria Lundqvist	– Monica
 Robert Gustafsson – Ulf
 Anastasios Soulis – Simon
 Anton Lundqvist – Oscar
 Rakel Wärmländer – Cissi
 Michalis Koutsogiannakis – Millitiadis
 Inga Landgré – Gunn-Britt
 Helena Bergström – Carina
 Kajsa Ernst	 – Annica
 Peshang Rad – Rami
 Gustav Levin – Håkan
 Frida Beckman – Sofia
 Neo Siambalis – Alex
 Paulina Pizarro Swartling – Ebba
 Rikard Wolff – julvärd
 Kerstin Widgren – Lady in the Subway sandwich store

Remake 
A Finnish remake of the film will be released in 2022 under the title Kulkuset kulkuset.

See also
 List of Christmas films

References

External links 
 

Swedish LGBT-related films
2015 LGBT-related films
LGBT-related comedy films
Swedish Christmas comedy films
2010s Christmas comedy films
2015 comedy films
2010s Swedish films